The 2017 Asian Formula Renault Series (aka AFR Series) is the 18th season of the AFR Series since its creation in 2000 by FRD. The season began on 18 March at the Zhuhai International Circuit and ended on 17 October at the Zhejiang International Circuit after six double-header events.

Starting from 2015, drivers and teams compete in two classes, Class A for drivers and teams competing with the 2013 FR2.0 car, and Class B for drivers and teams using the FR2.0 old spec cars.

As part of an enhanced agreement with Renault Sport, the season will feature a scholarship program for young Chinese drivers, called Road to Champion. The winner among these drivers over the last three rounds of the championship will secure a link to race the following year in Europe with the help of Renault Sport.

Teams and drivers

Race calendar and results

Championship standings

Points system

Points are awarded to the top 14 classified finishers. Drivers in classes A and B are classified separately.

Drivers' Championships

References

External links
 

Formula Renault seasons
2017 in Chinese motorsport
Asian Formula Renault